Roy Choudhury (born 21 January 1946) is an Indian former sports shooter. He competed at the 1972 Summer Olympics and the 1980 Summer Olympics.

References

External links
 

1946 births
Living people
Indian male sport shooters
Olympic shooters of India
Shooters at the 1972 Summer Olympics
Shooters at the 1980 Summer Olympics
Place of birth missing (living people)
Shooters at the 1970 Asian Games
Asian Games competitors for India
20th-century Indian people